An-Numan ibn Muqarrin (died December 641) was a companion of an Islamic prophet Muhammad. He was the leader of the tribe of Banu Muzaynah. The tribe of Banu Muzaynah had their habitations some distance from Yathrib on the caravan route which linked the city to Makkah.

During the Caliphate of Abu Bakr and Umar
An-Numan had several brothers, and all of them were accomplished soldiers. During the caliphate of Abu Bakr (r. 632–634), An-Numan and his family played a major role in putting an end to the apostasy wars. They fought under Khalid bin Waleed in the wars in Iraq, and later An-Numan fought under Sad Ibn Abi Waqqas. After the battle of Kaskar, Numan was appointed the administrator of the Kaskar district.

An-Numan was unhappy with the civil appointment and wrote to the caliph Umar ibn al-Khattab (r. 634–644) requesting active service. In the campaign against the Persians concentrated at Nihawand, Umar appointed An-Numan as the commander of the Muslim army. He was killed during the second phase of the Battle of Nihawānd on the third week of December 641.

See also
Sunni view of the Sahaba

Notes

Year of birth missing
641 deaths
Companions of the Prophet
Generals of the Rashidun Caliphate
People of the Muslim conquest of Persia